The Shippensburg Area School District is a midsized, suburban, public school district in Franklin County, Pennsylvania and Cumberland County, Pennsylvania. It is centered on the borough of Shippensburg and also serves Newburg, Hopewell Township, Shippensburg Township, and Southampton Township in Cumberland County and the adjacent and similarly named but independently governed Southampton Township along with Orrstown in Franklin County. According to 2000 federal census data it serves a resident population of 23,714 people. By 2010, the District's population increased to 28,243 people. In 2009, the District residents’ per capita income was $15,113, while the median family income was $45,273. In the Commonwealth, the median family income was $49,501 and the United States median family income was $49,445, in 2010.

The District partners with Shippensburg University in developing its academic programs of study and continuing education for the teachers.

Extracurriculars
The Shippensburg Area School District offers a variety of clubs, activities and an extensive sports program.

Sports
The District funds:

Boys
Baseball - AAA
Basketball- AAAA
Cross Country - AAA
Football - AAA
Golf - AAA
Soccer - AAA
Swimming and Diving - AAA
Track and Field - AAA
Wrestling - AAA

Girls
Basketball - AAA
Cross Country - AAA
Field Hockey - AAA
Soccer (Fall) - AAA
Softball - AAA
Swimming and Diving - AA
Track and Field - AAA
Volleyball - AAA

Middle School Sports

Boys
Basketball
Cross Country
Football
Soccer
Wrestling	

Girls
Basketball
Cross Country
Field Hockey
Soccer (Fall)
Volleyball 

According to PIAA directory July 2012

References

School districts in Cumberland County, Pennsylvania
School districts in Franklin County, Pennsylvania